The Boys Are Back is a 2009 drama film directed by Scott Hicks, produced by Greg Brenman and starring Clive Owen. It is based on the 2001 memoir, The Boys Are Back in Town, by Simon Carr.

Plot
Joe Warr (Clive Owen) is a British sportswriter who lives in Australia with his second wife and horse jockey, Katy (Laura Fraser) and his young son Artie (Nicholas McAnulty). Katy is diagnosed with cancer and dies, forcing Joe to cope with the responsibilities of being a single parent.

Joe's teenage son from his first marriage, Harry (George MacKay), feels abandoned in the United Kingdom with his mother. Harry uses Katy's death as an opportunity to try to build a relationship with his father, coming to visit him in Australia. Although Harry is initially unnerved by the lack of discipline in the house, he eventually forms a strong bond with Artie, while struggling to foster a closer relationship with Joe.

When Joe is forced by work to leave his sons alone in the house for a night, local teenagers throw a party at the house against both boys' will. With the house ransacked, Harry flies back to England because he no longer feels safe living with Joe. Joe and Artie go after him. After much discussion, Joe convinces Harry to move to Australia on a permanent basis.

The trio return to Australia, and together shoulder the responsibilities of running the household without a female influence.

Cast
 Clive Owen as Joe Warr
 Laura Fraser as Katy
 Emma Lung as Mia
 Nicholas McAnulty as Artie
 George MacKay as Harry
 Julia Blake as Barbara
 Emma Booth as Laura
 Erik Thomson as Digby
 Natasha Little as Flick
 Alexandra Schepisi as Mother
 Adam Morgan as Journalist
 Tommy Bastow as Ben
Luke O'Loughlin as Bree

Production
The script of The Boys Are Back was based on the 2001 memoir, The Boys Are Back in Town, by Simon Carr, adapted by Allan Cubitt.

The film was directed by Scott Hicks, produced by Greg Brenman and stars Clive Owen. It features a score composed by Hal Lindes.

Release
The film was released in the United Kingdom on 22 January 2010.

Reception
, the film holds a 73% approval rating on Rotten Tomatoes based on 126 reviews, with an average rating of 6.30/10. The website's critics' consensus reads: "Great performances by Clive Owen and The Boys save this melodrama from entering into the sappy territory it might have in less competent hands."

Box office
The Boys Are Back grossed  at the box office in Australia, and US$809,752 in the United States, grossing US$3,185,839 worldwide.

See also
 Cinema of Australia
 Cinema of New Zealand
 Cinema of the UK

References

External links
 
 

2009 films
2009 drama films
Australian drama films
British drama films
HanWay Films films
Drama films based on actual events
Films set in South Australia
Films shot in Adelaide
Films about father–son relationships
Films about grieving
Films about widowhood
Films directed by Scott Hicks
2000s English-language films
Screen Australia films
2000s British films